"Make It Easy" is a 1991 song by the progressive rock band Yes. An early version of this song from 1981 was written and sung by Trevor Rabin, originally as a demo titled "Don't Give In". It was later re-worked by Yes which included Chris Squire, Alan White and Tony Kaye after Jon Anderson made his departure from the band.

The song was unreleased until 1991, when it was included on the Yes boxed set Yesyears and released as a cassette single backed with "Long Distance Runaround". The single debuted on the Billboard Hot Mainstream Rock Tracks chart in August 1991, eventually peaking at number 36. It was later included as a bonus track on the remastered version of 90125.

Background 
The 1980 incarnation of Yes included Trevor Horn, Geoff Downes, Steve Howe, Chris Squire and Alan White. When this group split up following the tour for the album Drama, Squire and White joined forces with South African singer and guitarist Trevor Rabin. The three were eventually joined by former Yes keyboardist Tony Kaye, and the four began writing and recording demos under the band name "Cinema".

Demos produced from the Cinema sessions included "Make It Easy" and "It's Over", with both having lead vocals by Rabin, and an early version of "It Can Happen" featuring Squire on vocals.  The Cinema version of "It Can Happen" and "Make It Easy" appeared as previously unreleased recordings on 1991's Yesyears boxed set compilation,
and "Make It Easy", recorded in 1981,
was released as a cassette single, backed with "Long Distance Runaround", from 1971's Fragile. The single debuted on the Billboard Hot Mainstream Rock Tracks chart August 24, 1991, eventually peaking at number 36.

Both "Make It Easy" and the demo version of "It Can Happen" as well as "It's Over" were later included as bonus tracks on the remastered version of 90125 released in 2004 by Rhino Records.

The beginning of "Make It Easy" has been used as an Intro into "Owner of a Lonely Heart" when played live by Yes from 1984 to 2000. Steve Howe has never performed it with the exception of his appearance with Yes at the Trevor Horn Celebration Concert in 2004; during the 2017 Rock and Roll Hall of Fame induction, Rabin played the "Make it Easy" intro alongside Howe, but Howe did not join in until the beginning of "Owner of a Lonely Heart" proper (during which he played bass).  Billy Sherwood played guitar on the "Make it Easy" intro on the Open Your Eyes and The Ladder tours.

In 2003, the early version of this song was released by Trevor Rabin on a collection of demos titled 90124. The track is mistakenly listed as "Cinema Demo 1981". The liner notes reveal the song's real title, "Don't Give In".

References 

1991 singles
Yes (band) songs
Songs written by Trevor Rabin